Ahmed I. Zayed is an Egyptian American mathematician. His research interests include Sampling Theory, Wavelets, Medical Imaging, Fractional Fourier transform，Sinc Approximations, Boundary Value Problems, Special Functions and Orthogonal polynomials, Integral transforms.

Zayed is a professor at DePaul University. He also has taught at University of California-Berkeley, University of Wisconsin–Milwaukee, The American University in Cairo, University of Carlos III and University of Central Florida.

Education
 Ph.D. in Mathematics, University of Wisconsin–Milwaukee, 1979.
 M.S. in Applied Mathematics, Cairo University, 1974.
 B.S. Pure and Applied Mathematics, Cairo University, 1970.

Editorial boards
 Managing editor, Journal of Sampling Theory in Image and Signal Processing
 Assistant editor, The International Journal of Mathematics and Computer Science
 Associate editor, Journal of Multidimensional Systems and Signal Processing
 Associate editor, Journal of Computational Analysis and Applications
 Assistant editor, The International Journal of Mathematics and Mathematical Sciences
 Associate editor, International Journal of Fractional Calculus and Applied Analysis
 Associate editor, Journal of Generalized Functions
 Member of the editorial board of Journal of Mathematics and Statistics
 Member of the editorial board of the International Journal of Applied Mathematics

Selected publications

Books and chapters
Frames and Operator Theory in Analysis and Signal Processing, American Mathematical Society, Contemporary Mathematics Series,  Vol 451, 2008.
Topics in Harmonic Analysis and Ergodic Theory, American Mathematical Society, Contemporary Mathematics Series, Vol 444, 2007.
Sampling, Wavelets, and Tomography, co-editor with J. Benedetto, Birkhauser, Boston, 2003.
Function and Generalized Function Transformations, CRC Press, Boca Raton, Florida, 1996.
Mathematical Analysis, Wavelets and Signal Processing, American Mathematical Society, Contemporary Mathematics Series, Vol. 190 (1995), co-editor with M. Ismail, and Z. Nahsed.
Advances in Shannon's Sampling Theory, CRC Press, Boca Raton, Florida, 1993.
 “The Wavelet, Directional Wavelet, and Ridgelet Transforms With Applications in Texture Identification”, (with L. Dettori), in Modern Mathematical Models, Methods and Algorithms for Real World Systems, Anamaya Publisher, New Delhi-London (2007).
“Comparison of a Wavelet-Galerkin Procedure With a Crank-Nicolson-Galerkin Procedure for the Diffusion Equation Subject to the Specification of Mass,” Chapter 5, in Mathematical Models and Methods for Real-World systems, Taylor & Francis Group, FL (2005).
 Chapter on "Wavelets," Encyclopedia of Optical Engineering, CRC Press.
"The Zak transform," Encyclopedia of Mathematics, Supplement III, Kluwer Publications
“Shannon-type Wavelets and the Convergence of their Associated Wavelet Series,” in Modern Sampling Theory: Mathematics and Applications, Birkhause Publishing Company (2001), pp. 135–152.
"Integral Transforms," 30th Edition of CRC Standard Tables and Formulae, CRC Press, FL, 1995.

Articles

"A Generalization of the prolate spheroidal wave functions,” Proceedings of the American Mathematical Society, Vol. 135, (2007), pp. 2193–2203
“Sampling expansions of functions having values in a Banach space,” Proceedings of the American Mathematical Society, Vol. 133, # 12 (2005), pp. 3597– 3607 (jointly with D. Han).
A. Boumenir and A. Zayed, “The equivalence of Kramer and Shannon sampling theorems revisited,” Journal of Sampling Theory in Image and Signal Processing, Vol. 4, No. 3 (2005), pp. 251–269.
A comparison between the Adomian decomposition and the sinc-Galerkin methods for solving nonlinear boundary-value problems,” Journal of Computational Analysis and Applications, Vol. 7, No. 1(2005)), pp. 5-20 (jointly with E. Deeba and J. Yoon)
“Sinc-Galerkin method for solving non-linear boundary-value problems,” Journal of Computers and Mathematics with Applications, Vol. 48, No. 9 (2004), pp. 1285–1298 (jointly with M. El-Gamel).
“Sinc-Galerkin method for solving linear sixth order boundary-value problems,“ Mathematics of Computation,” American Mathematical Society, Vol. 73, No. 247 (2004), pp. 1325-1343 (jointly with M. El-Gamel and J. Cannon).
“A q-analogue of the Whittaker-Shannon-Kotel’nikov Sampling theorem, Proceedings of the American Mathematical Society, Vol. 131, pp. 3711-3719 (2003), (jointly with M. Ismail).
“Fractional Wigner distribution and ambiguity functions,” (jointly with V. B. Shakhmurov) Journal of Fractional Calculus and Applied Analysis, Vol. 6. No. 4 (2003), pp. 473–490.
“A Comparison between the wavelet-Galerkin and the Sinc-Galerkin methods in solving non-homogeneous heat equations,” (Jointly with M. El Gamel), Contemporary Mathematics, American Mathematical Society, Vol. 313 (2002), pp. 97–116.
"Sampling on a string," (jointly with A. Boumenir), The Journal of Fourier Analysis and Applications, Vol. 8 (2002), pp. 211–231.
“Paley-Wiener-type theorem for a class of integral transforms,” (jointly with V. k. Tuan), the Journal of Math. Anal. & Appls, Vol. 266 (2002), pp. 200–226.
“Density deconvolution of different conditional distributions,” (jointly with M. Pensky), Annals of the Institute of Statistical Mathematics, Vol. 54 (2002), pp. 701–712.
"On the relationship between the fractional Fourier transform and the Riemann-Liouville fractional integral, Proceedings of the International Association for Mathematics and Computers in Simulation (IMACS), May 2000.
“Generalization of a theorem of Boas to a class of integral transforms,” (jointly with V. k. Tuan), the Journal of Resultät der Mathematik. Vol. 38 (2000), pp. 362–376.
"Kramer's sampling theorem with discontinuous kernels," (jointly with A, Garcia), Resultät der Mathematik, Vol. 34 (1998), pp. 197–206.
"Multiresolution analysis with sampling subspaces," (jointly with G. Walter), Journal of Fractional Calculus and Applied Analysis, Vol. 1 (1998), pp. 109–124.
"Fractional Fourier transform of generalized functions," Journal of Integral Transforms and Special Functions, Vol. 7 No. 4(1998), pp. 299–312
"On the use of Green's function in sampling theory," (jointly with M. Annaby) Journal of Integral Equations and Applications, Vol. 10 (1998), pp. 117–139.
"New orthonormal sets and bases of the space of bandlimited functions", Proceedings of the International Conference on Sampling Theory and Applications, Aveiro, Portugal, June 1997.
"Sampling theorems associated with Dirac operator and the Hartley transform", (jointly with A. Garcia) the Journal of Math. Anal. Appls, Vol. 214 (1997), pp. 587–598.
"New orthogonal sets and frames in the Paley-Wiener space," Comptes Rendus Mathématiques de la Société Royale du Canada, Vol. 18, (1996), pp. 181–183
"Wavelet expansions of analytic hyperfunctions,"the Journal of Integral Transforms and Special Functions, Vol. 3 (1995), pp. 305-320.
"A generalized sampling theorem with the inverse of an arbitrary square summable sequence as sampling points, The Journal of Fourier Analysis and Applications, Vol. 2 (1996), pp. 303-314.
"Characterization of analytic functions in terms of their wavelet coefficients," (jointly with G. Walter), the Journal of Complex Variable: Theory and Applications, Vol. 29 (1996), pp. 265–276.
"On the extension of the Zak transform," (jointly with P. Mikusinski), The Journal of Methods and Applications of Analysis, Vol. 2 (1995), pp. 160–172.
"Sampling theorem for signals bandlimited to a general domain in several variables," Journal of Mathematical Analysis and Applications, Vol. 187, 1(1994), pp. 196–211.
"New summation formulas for multivariate infinite series by using sampling theorems," the Journal of Applicable Analysis, Vol. 54, 1(1994), pp. 135–150.
 " Wavelet transforms of periodic generalized functions, "the Journal of Mathematical Analysis and Applications., Vol. 183, 2(1994), pp. 391-412.
"Sampling theorem for functions bandlimited to a disc," The journal of Complex Variables: Theory and Applications, vol. 26, 3(1994), pp. 245–254.
"A new role of Green's function in interpolation and sampling theory, "the Journal of Mathematical Analysis and Applications, Vol. 175 (1993), pp. 222-238.
"Kramer's sampling theorem for multidimensional signals and its relationship with Lagrange-type interpolation," The Journal of multidimensional systems and signal processing, Vol. 3 (1992), pp. 323–340.
"A question on the existence of certain boundary-value problems," The Reviews of the Society for Industrial and Applied Mathematics (SIAM Rev.) Vol. 34 (1992), pp. 118–119.
"On the inversion of integral transforms associated with Sturm-Liouville problems," jointly with G. Walter, the Journal of Mathematical Analysis and Applications, Vol. 164, No. 1(1992), pp. 285–306.
"Inversion of integral transforms associated with a class of perturbed heat equations," jointly with D. Haimo, the Journal of Mathematical Analysis and Applications, Vol. 163, No. 1(1992), pp. 113–135.
On Lagrange interpolations and Kramer's sampling theorem associated with self-adjoint boundary-value problems," jointly with M. El-Sayed and M. Annaby, the Journal of Mathematical Analysis and Applications, Vol. 158, No. 1 (1991), pp. 269-284.
"On Kramer's sampling theorem associated with general Sturm-Liouville boundary-value problems and Lagrange interpolation," the Journal of Applied Mathematics of the Society for Industrial and Applied Mathematics., Vol. 51, No. 2 (1991), pp. 575–604.
"Generalized Faber expansions of hyperfunctions on analytic curves," the Journal of the Mathematical Society of Japan, Vol. 42, No. 1 (1990), pp. 155–170.
"On integral transforms whose kernels are solutions of singular Sturm-Liouville problems, Proceedings of the Royal Society of Edinburgh, 108A, (1988), pp. 201-228.
"Sampling expansions for the continuous Bessel transform," Journal of Applicable Analysis, Vol. 27 (1988), pp. 47–64.
"A generalized inversion formula for the continuous Jacobi transform when = 0," the International Journal of Mathematics and Mathematical Sciences., Vol. 10, No. 4 (1987), pp. 671–692.
"A generalized inversion formula for the continuous Jacobi transform," Mathematical Reports of the Canadian Academy of Science, Vol. 8, No. 4 (1986), pp. 271–276.
"Real singularities of Sturm-Liouville expansions" the Journal of Mathematical Analysis of the Society for Industrial and Applied Mathematics., Vol. 18, No. 1 (1987), pp. 219–227 (jointly with G. Walter).
"Complex and real singularities of eigenfunction expansions," Proceedings of the Royal Society of Edinburgh, Vol. 103A (1986), pp. 179–199.
"On the singularities of singular Sturm-Liouville expansions and an associated class of elliptic P.D.E.'s." the Journal of Mathematical Analysis of the Society for Industrial and Applied Mathematics., Vol. 16, No. 4 (1985), pp. 725–740 (jointly with G. Walter).
"Series of orthogonal polynomials as hyperfunctions," the Journal of Mathematical Analysis of the Society for Industrial and Applied Mathematics, Vol. 13, No. 4 (1982), pp. 664–675 (jointly with G. Walter).
"Laguerre series as boundary values," the Journal of Mathematical Analysis of the Society for Industrial and Applied Mathematics, Vol. 13, No. 2 (1982), pp. 263–279.

References

External links
Dr. Ahmed I. Zayed Homepage at DePaul University

University of Wisconsin–Milwaukee alumni
University of Central Florida faculty
DePaul University faculty
20th-century American mathematicians
21st-century American mathematicians
Living people
University of California, Berkeley staff
Academic staff of the Charles III University of Madrid
Year of birth missing (living people)